The Lezoux plate is a ceramic plate discovered in 1970 at Lezoux (Puy-de-Dôme), which contains one of the longer texts in the Gaulish language (in a Gallo-Latin cursive script) which has yet been found.

Bibliography 
 Xavier Delamarre, Dictionnaire de la langue gauloise, Ed. Errance, Paris, 2003
 Pierre-Yves Lambert, La langue gauloise, Ed. Errance, Paris, 2003
 Pierre-Yves Lambert, Recueil des inscriptions gauloises (R.I.G.).: Textes gallo-latins sur Instrumentum Éditions du Centre national de la recherche scientifique, 2002 - 1650 pages
 l'Arbre Celtique

Gaulish inscriptions
French pottery